Claudia Rowe is a journalist who currently works for The Seattle Times.  In the past, she has worked for The New York Times, Mother Jones, Woman’s Day, The Huffington Post and The Stranger and other newspapers and magazines. She has been a member of the Humanities Washington Speakers Bureau.

Awards

Claudia has won many awards for her work in journalism and is a celebrated reporter and advocate. 
 She received the Casey Medal for Meritorious Journalism award in 2006, for "Judgment Calls: When to remove a child?", and won in 2008 for “One Fatal Shot”.
 She also received first place awards from the Society of Professional Journalists. 
 She was given the Taylor Award from the Nieman Foundation for Journalism in 2009.

The Spider and the Fly

In 1998, Claudia was living in Poughkeepsie, New York, working for The New York Times.  She was assigned to cover the murders by Kendall Francois, a serial killer who murdered at least eight women.  Claudia spent five years talking with Kendall in a quest to understand what made him tick and why he committed such horrific crimes.  The end result is The Spider and the Fly: A Reporter, a Serial Killer, and the Meaning of Murder, a book about Kendall, his effect upon her and how he helped her to overcome her own struggles. Published by Dey Street Books on January 24, 2017, the book is presented as "part psychological thriller and part gut-wrenching memoir." (Review from Robert Kolker.)

References

External links
Official Site

American journalists
American women journalists
Living people
Year of birth missing (living people)
21st-century American women